The Eilabun massacre was committed by soldiers of Israel Defense Forces during Operation Hiram on 30 October 1948. A total of 14 men from the Arab Christian village of Eilabun (Eilaboun) were killed, 12 of them executed by the Israeli forces after the village had surrendered. The remaining villagers were expelled to Lebanon, living as refugees for some months before being allowed to return in 1949 as part of an agreement between the state of Israel and Archbishop Maximos V Hakim.

It was one of the few Arab villages to which most of the displaced were eventually able to return. The Massacre was documented by the documentary film Sons of Eilaboun by Hisham Zreiq, a film based upon the events as told by the villagers.

Overview 
Christian villages, which were usually friendly or not hostile to the Yishuv, were generally left in peace by Yishuv forces. The forces of Fawzi al-Qawuqji's Arab Liberation Army (ALA) occupied Eilabun. On the 12th of September 1948, two Israeli soldiers were killed on a nearby hilltop, Outpost 213. The severed heads of the Israeli soldiers were carried by the ALA troops and inhabitants of the village in a procession through the village.

After a battle outside the village in which six Israeli soldiers were injured and four Israeli armoured cars were destroyed, a battle that was part of Operation Hiram, the Golani Brigade's 12th Battalion, entered the village on 30 October 1948 and the population surrendered. Villagers flew white flags and were escorted by four local priests. Most of the villagers were hiding in two churches. The soldiers however were angry due to battle losses, the earlier procession, and possibly the discovery of a rotting head in one of the houses.

According to a letter by village elders, one villager was killed and another wounded by IDF fire while assembling at the IDF's orders in the village square. The IDF commander then selected 12 young men, ordered that the 800 assembled inhabitants be led to nearby Maghar, and then stayed behind to execute the 12 men. Another old man was killed by fire from an armoured car on the way. Some 42 young men were kept in a POW detention camp, and the inhabitants were expelled to Lebanon.

About fifty-two villagers were left in Eliabun, mainly the elderly and children. The village priests complained bitterly about the expulsion of the villagers and demanded their return. Following a United Nations investigation and pressure from the Vatican and discussion within the Israeli government, the villagers were allowed to return and receive Israeli citizenship as part of a 1949 agreement between the state of Israel and archbishop Maximos V Hakim in return for Hakim's future goodwill. In 1967, Hakim was elevated to Patriarch of the Melkite Catholic Church of the East.

The event was documented in a report by the United Nations observers. In 1983 the victims were commemorated by a memorial monument adjacent to the Christian cemetery in Eilabun. A second monument commemorating the massacre was built in 1998 but it was soon vandalized and practically effaced.

Eilabun massacre in film
The Sons of Eilaboun is a 2007 documentary film by Palestinian artist and film maker Hisham Zreiq that tells the story of the massacre.

See also
 Killings and massacres during the 1948 Palestine War
 The Sons of Eilaboun
 List of massacres in Israel

References

Citations

Sources

 Morris, Benny, The Birth of the Palestinian Refugee Problem Revisited, Cambridge University Press, 2004.
 Palumbo, Michael. The Palestinian Catastrophe: The 1948 Expulsion Of A People From Their Homeland, London: Quartet, 1989.

External links
 Palestine Remembered - Eliabun
 The Sons of Eliaboun
 Sons of Eilaboun
 Palestinian Diaspora by Gary Olson
 Leaving Haifa, 1999
 The Palestinians' Right of Return by Robin Miller
 The expulsion of the Palestinians re-examined By Dominique Vidal
 Right of Return story

October 1948 events in Asia
1948 massacres of Palestinians
1948 in Mandatory Palestine
1948 in Israel